These are the results for the women’s singles badminton tournament of 2000 Summer Olympics. The tournament was single-elimination. Matches consisted of three sets, with sets being to 11 for women's singles. The tournament was held at Pavilion 3, Sydney Olympic Park.

Seeds 
  (gold medalist)
  (silver medalist)
  (fourth place)
  (bronze medalist)
  (quarterfinals)
  (quarterfinals)
  (third round)
  (quarterfinals)

Draw

Finals

Section 1

Section 2

Section 3

Section 4

References

External links 
 2000 Sydney Olympic Games – Women’s singles

Badminton at the 2000 Summer Olympics
Olymp
Women's events at the 2000 Summer Olympics